Valgrana is a comune (municipality) in the Province of Cuneo in the Italian region Piedmont, located about  southwest of Turin and about  northwest of Cuneo.

Valgrana borders the following municipalities: Bernezzo, Caraglio, Montemale di Cuneo, Monterosso Grana, and Rittana.

References

Cities and towns in Piedmont